Evgeny Donskoy and Alibek Kachmazov were the defending champions but lost in the first round to Toshihide Matsui and Kaito Uesugi.

Benjamin Lock and Yuta Shimizu won the title after defeating Francis Alcantara and Christopher Rungkat 6–1, 6–3 in the final.

Seeds

Draw

References

External links
 Main draw

Nonthaburi Challenger II - Doubles